The Western Asiatic Games was a multi-sport event for athletes from Western Asia. The games were established since as a replacement to the Far Eastern Games, which were cancelled due to the political difficulties between China and Japan. The games were suggested and organized by the IOC member in India, Guru Dutt Sondhi.

The scope of the Games comprised all the countries east of Suez and west of Singapore. The first and only edition of the games was celebrated in Delhi, India from 27 February to 3 March 1934. A second event was planned to be held in Tel Aviv, Palestine Mandate, however the games were cancelled due to the armed conflict in the region.

The Asian Games was later launched as a successor competition and, at a more narrow regional level, the West Asian Games emerged to fulfil the position of an event for West Asia.

1934 Western Asiatic Games
The First Western Asiatic Games was celebrated in Delhi between 27 February and 3 March 1934 at the Irwin Amphitheater. Four countries—Afghanistan, British India, Palestine Mandate and Ceylon—participated. The participants competed in athletics, aquatic sports, including swimming and diving, and field hockey.

All competitors were male, and no women took part in the games. The delegation from Palestine Mandate included only Jewish athletes.

Results

Athletics
Athletics was contested at the Irwin Amphitheater, New Delhi from 2 to 3 March.

Aquatics
Aquatic sports, including Swimming and Diving were contested at Patiala from February 25 to February 26, 1934.

Field hockey
The final was contested between India and Afghanistan. The Indian team defeated Afghanistan 5–0.

Medal table

See also

Other Games celebrated in India:
1951 Asian Games
1982 Asian Games
1987 South Asian Games
1995 South Asian Games
2016 South Asian Games

References
 Official Report
Sport Israel, Nehemiah ben Avraham (Israel), 1968, pp. 155–156

1934 in multi-sport events
Sports competitions in Delhi
1930s in Delhi
Multi-sport events in Asia
Defunct multi-sport events
International sports competitions hosted by India
Asian international sports competitions
1934 in sports
Athletics in New Delhi
International athletics competitions hosted by India
1934 in Indian sport
1934 in Asian sport